Petrinje is a small village in the Municipality of Hrpelje-Kozina in the Littoral region of Slovenia.

Mass grave
Petrinje is the site of a mass grave associated with the Second World War. The Wasp Shaft Mass Grave is located in a terraced area west of Brdgodec Hill north of Petrinje. It contains the remains of undetermined victims.

Church

The local church is dedicated to Saint Sebastian and belongs to the Parish of Klanec.

References

External links

Petrinje on Geopedia

Populated places in the Municipality of Hrpelje-Kozina